Sugar Ray Leonard vs. Héctor Camacho, billed as Defying the Odds,  was a professional boxing match contested between former five-division world champion Sugar Ray Leonard and defending IBC middleweight champion Héctor Camacho. The bout took place on March 1, 1997 at the Convention Hall in Atlantic City, New Jersey, with Camacho's IBC title on the line. Camacho retained his title via fifth-round technical knockout.

Background
In 1996, "Sugar" Ray Leonard began talks to end his fourth retirement and return to boxing to face former 3-division world champion Héctor Camacho. After months of negotiations, the fight was officially announced at a press conference in October. The 40-year old Leonard had not fought since losing to WBC super welterweight champion Terry Norris by a lopsided unanimous decision in February 1991, whilst the 34-year old Camacho had not won a major world title fight since 1990 and was also considered past his prime, though he had captured the lightly regarded IBC middleweight title after defeating Roberto Durán in June 1996. After defeating Duran, Camacho challenged Leonard, who was working as a broadcaster for the fight, and negotiations between the two fighters began two days later. Despite both fighters being past their prime, there was considerable hype for the fight as Leonard both appeared on the cover and was the subject of the feature story of the March 3, 1997 issue of Sports Illustrated and the decision was made to broadcast the fight on pay-per-view.

In December 1996, the fight was put in jeopardy when the New Jersey Casino Control Commission refused to allow New Contenders Inc. to promote the fight due to alleged organized crime ties and legal issues had by New Contenders chairman Michael Blutrich. Both the bout's sponsor Sun International and television provider TVKO (HBO's pay-per-view division) both pulled out as a result of the controversy. However, the fight was back on the following month after finding a new promoter (Dillon Promotions), a new sponsor (Caesars Atlantic City) and a new pay-per-view distributor (Titan Sports Inc.).

The fight
Hampered by a previously undisclosed calf injury that limited his mobility, Leonard struggled throughout the fight. Camacho would open a cut over Leonard's eye in the fourth with an accidental headbutt. Camacho would then open the fifth round stunning Leonard with a left hook followed by a right hand and three left uppercuts that dropped Leonard to the canvas. A dazed Leonard would get up and continue the fight but Camacho swarmed in with a barrage of unanswered punches forcing the referee to stop the fight at 1:08 of the round, giving Camacho a victory by technical knockout.

Fight card

References

1997 in boxing
1997 in sports in New Jersey
Camacho
March 1997 sports events in the United States
Boxing matches at Boardwalk Hall